Angkor EV (mentioned in sources with various names including  Angkor 333-1000, Angkor, Angkor EV 2011, Angkor EV 2013 and Angkor EV 2014) is a proposed Cambodian electric car developed by the company Heng Development.

History
Various vehicles were developed under the name Angkor or Angkor 333-1000 as a private initiative of Nhean Phaloek. They were open-roof, two-seater microcars. Reliable technical specifications of these vehicles, of which the alleged third version caused an increased media interest, are not available.

As early as 2011, a mass-production version was announced. In early 2013, Heng Development presented a revised version of the closed-body model. At the same time, technical problems had allegedly been resolved. 

By mid-2013, production had not started yet. In 2014, after investors withdrew from the project, Heng Development was looking for new ones. 

However, mass-production can not be verified .

Technical specifications
According to data given in 2014 by the car developer Phalleok, the vehicle would reach a speed of 60 km/h and have a range of up to 300 kilometres. The equipment would include GPS and keyless ignition system. 

References and sources
 The entry incorporates text translated from the corresponding German Wikipedia entry as of 2019-01-20.

Cars introduced in 2013
Microcars